The 2005 Chatham Cup was the 78th annual nationwide knockout football competition in New Zealand.

Up to the last 16 of the competition, the cup was run in three regions (northern, central, and southern), with an open draw from the quarter-finals on. In all, 129 teams took part in the competition. The numbering of rounds in the competition is unclear — some sources record one preliminary round and four full rounds, followed by quarter-finals, semi-finals, and a final; other sources record five rounds. The latter numbering is used in this article.

The scoring record for any Chatham Cup match was equalled in the second round, with Central United demolishing Norwest United 21–0. This tied the previous record set in 1998, when Metro also put 21 goals past the hapless Norwest United.

The 2005 final

The Jack Batty Memorial Cup is awarded to the player adjudged to have made to most positive impact in the Chatham Cup final. The winner of the 2005 Jack Batty Memorial Cup was Central United captain and goalkeeper Ross Nicholson.

Results

Third Round

* Won on penalties by Halswell (3-1)
† Western Suburbs fielded an ineligible player; result changed to 2-0 win to Petone

Fourth Round

Fifth Round

* Eastern Suburbs won 5–4 on penalties.

Quarter-finals

Semi-finals

Final

References

Rec.Sport.Soccer Statistics Foundation New Zealand 2005 page
Ultimatenzsoccer.com 2005 Chatham Cup page

Chatham Cup
Chatham Cup
Chatham Cup
Chat